Ady is an unincorporated community in Potter County, located in the U.S. state of Texas.

References

Unincorporated communities in Potter County, Texas
Unincorporated communities in Texas